Tak Fa is a district (amphoe) in southeastern part of Nakhon Sawan province.

History
When Thai government built the Phahonyothin Highway, the district was formed by territory taken from Takhli district. It became a district on 13 October 1970.

The word "Tak Fa" means "sun drying" or "sunbath" in Thai, because the terrain here is a ground and jungle. The villagers therefore clothed in the sun and called here "Lan Tak Pha" (ลานตากผ้า) and mispronounced to Tak Fa finally.

Geography
Neighboring districts are (from the southwest clockwise): Takhli, Phayuha Khiri, Tha Tako, and Phaisali of Nakhon Sawan Province, and Nong Muang of Lopburi province.

Administration
The district is divided into seven sub-districts (tambons), which are further subdivided into 77 villages (mubans). The township (thesaban tambon) of Tak Fa covers parts of the tambon Tak Fa and Suk Samran. There are a further seven tambon administrative organizations (TAO).

References

External links
amphoe.com

Tak Fa